Arhopala chamaeleona is a butterfly in the family Lycaenidae. It was described by George Thomas Bethune-Baker in 1903. It is found in the Indomalayan and Australasian realms.

Subspecies
A. c. chamaeleona (Biak, Noemfoor, Jobi, New Guinea)
A. c. rileyi Joicey & Talbot, 1922 (Serang)
A. c. mizunumai (Hayashi, 1978) (Philippines: Leyte, Samar, Mindanao, Marinduque)
A. c. maputi (Takanami, 1984) (Philippines: Marinduque)
A. c. susyae Tennent & Rawlins, 2010 (Moluccas)

References

External links
"Arhopala Boisduval, 1832 at Markku Savela's Lepidoptera and Some Other Life Forms

Arhopala
Butterflies described in 1903
Butterflies of Asia
Butterflies of Oceania
Taxa named by George Thomas Bethune-Baker